Shiroor railway station is a station in Shiroor village Byndoor, Udupi district, Karnataka) on Konkan Railway. It is at a distance of  down from origin station Roha. The preceding station on the line is Bhatkal railway station and the next station is Mookambika Road Byndoor railway station.

References 

Railway stations along Konkan Railway line
Railway stations in Udupi district
Karwar railway division